"Don't Stop (Wiggle Wiggle)" is a 1994 song by American hip-house duo the Outhere Brothers from their debut album, 1 Polish, 2 Biscuits & a Fish Sandwich. It topped the charts in the Republic of Ireland, Spain, and the United Kingdom. Although the music video and radio edit of the song featured a remixed, clean version of the song, the original, explicit lyrics were featured on different versions of the track on the CD single.

Chart performance
"Don't Stop (Wiggle Wiggle)" was a major hit on the charts on several continents and remains one of the duo's most successful songs to date. 
In Europe, the song topped the charts in the Republic of Ireland, Spain and the United Kingdom. In the latter country, the song peaked at the top of the UK Singles Chart on March 26, 1995 – for the week ending date April 1, 1995 – during its third week on the chart. In Spain, it spent a total of five weeks at the top position. It was a Top 10 hit also in Belgium (number two), Italy and the Netherlands, as well as on the Eurochart Hot 100, where it hit number four. Outside Europe, "Don't Stop (Wiggle Wiggle)" peaked at number five in Australia, number 22 on the Billboard Hot Dance Club Play in the Outhere Brothers' native United States and number 29 in New Zealand.

Track listings
 12-inch maxi – UK (1995)
"Don't Stop (Wiggle Wiggle)" (OHB Club Version) – 4:40
"Don't Stop (Wiggle Wiggle)" (OHB Club Remix) – 4:58
"Don't Stop (Wiggle Wiggle)" (Ramirez Tribal Remix) – 4:23
"Don't Stop (Wiggle Wiggle)" (Itchy And Scratchy Vocal Mix) – 5:50
"Don't Stop (Wiggle Wiggle)" (Seb And Vernes Dub) – 5:28

 CD single – UK (1995)
"Don't Stop (Wiggle Wiggle)" (Townhouse Radio Edit) – 3:06
"Don't Stop (Wiggle Wiggle)" (Original Radio Version) – 3:19
"Don't Stop (Wiggle Wiggle)" (OHB Club Version) – 4:40
"Don't Stop (Wiggle Wiggle)" (Itchy & Scratchy Vocal Mix) – 5:50
"Don't Stop (Wiggle Wiggle)" (DFC Tribal Remix) – 4:20
"Don't Stop (Wiggle Wiggle)" (DFC Techno Remix) – 4:26

Charts

Weekly charts

Year-end charts

Certifications

References

1994 songs
1995 singles
The Outhere Brothers songs
UK Singles Chart number-one singles
Irish Singles Chart number-one singles
Number-one singles in Scotland
House music songs
Number-one singles in Spain